Daniel Lewis Gardella (February 26, 1920 – March 6, 2005) was an American left fielder in Major League Baseball who played with the New York Giants (1944–45) and St. Louis Cardinals (1950). Born in New York City, he batted and threw left-handed. (Others included Sal Maglie,  Alex Carrasquel, Max Lanier and Mickey Owen.)

Career
Known more for his on-field antics than his playing ability, Gardella would often walk on his hands, and perform other acrobatic stunts. He was also one of the first players to train with weights. Nevertheless, he was the first major league player who challenged baseball's reserve clause in an early chapter in the labor-management skirmishes that brought free agency and multimillion-dollar player contracts.

Major League Baseball
In a three-season career, Gardella compiled a .267 batting average with 24 home runs and 85 RBI in 169 games. His most productive season came in 1945, when he hit .272 with 18 home runs and 71 RBI in 121 games. In that season, some of his teammates included Ernie Lombardi, Mel Ott, Joe Medwick and Bill Voiselle.

Mexican League
However, in 1946, the Giants were interested in players returning from World War II military service. Gardella had been offered US$4,500 to play for the Giants and $10,000 to play in Mexico. He joined the Mexican League, whose generous salaries also attracted major leaguers including pitchers Sal Maglie, Alex Carrasquel and Max Lanier and catcher Mickey Owen. In response, Commissioner Happy Chandler imposed a ban of at least five years on all the players who had gone to the Mexican League for violating the reserve clause. Shortstop Vern Stephens also joined the exodus but immediately returned before the season started to escape the sanction. The first player to learn of Chandler's seriousness was Owen, who returned the same year, asked for clemency, and was refused.

Lawsuit
In October 1947, unable to get a baseball job in the major or minor leagues after playing in Mexico, Gardella sued the Major League Baseball hierarchy and the Giants in the United States District Court for the Southern District of New York, seeking $300,000 in damages. He charged that the reserve clause was "monopolistic and restrains trade." A year later, the case was dismissed by a federal judge who cited a 1922 Supreme Court ruling that found baseball was not a business engaged in interstate commerce within the meaning of federal antitrust law. But in February 1949, the Second Circuit Court of Appeals, in a 2-to-1 ruling, sent the case back to the district court and ordered a trial on Gardella's contentions.

In June 1949, faced with the prospect of a courtroom defeat, Chandler offered amnesty to the players who had gone to the Mexican League. Gardella, warned by his lawyer that he faced a long and costly legal battle, dropped his lawsuit. He said later that he received a $60,000 settlement from baseball.

Later years
In 1950 Gardella signed with the St. Louis Cardinals, but was sent to the minors after one at bat and never again played in the major leagues. After leaving the game, he worked in a warehouse, as a hospital orderly and as a gym trainer.

Many years after Gardella faded from the baseball scene, the United States Supreme Court rejected two challenges to the reserve clause, most notably in the case, brought by outfielder Curt Flood. However, the players won free agency on December 23, 1975 after arbitrator Peter Seitz, ruling in a case brought by pitchers Dave McNally and Andy Messersmith, found that players could leave their teams after playing out their contracts.

Reflecting on his lawsuit and his possible consequences in an interview with the Los Angeles Times in 1994, Gardella took pride in having brought his court challenge. "I feel I let the whole world know that the reserve clause was unfair," he said. "It had the odor of peonage, even slavery."

Gardella died from congestive heart failure in Yonkers, New York on March 6, 2005, at age 85.

See also
 Van Lingle Mungo (song)

References

External links

Baseball Library
Historic Baseball

1920 births
2005 deaths
Baseball players from New York (state)
Beckley Bengals players
Fulton Tigers players
Houston Buffaloes players
Jersey City Giants players
Major League Baseball left fielders
New York Giants (NL) players
St. Louis Cardinals players
Salem-Roanoke Friends players
Shelby Colonels players
Trois-Rivières Royals players
Drummondville Cubs players
Williamston Martins players